Dezmen Southward (born October 1, 1990) is a former American football free safety. He played college football at Wisconsin, and was drafted by the Atlanta Falcons in the third round of the 2014 NFL Draft.

High school career
Southward attended St. Thomas Aquinas High School in Fort Lauderdale, Florida, where he did not start playing organized football until his senior year. He was a starting defensive back for the team, helping lead the team to a national championship. He was also a key member of the school's basketball team, being named a three-year captain and two-time team MVP.

He was considered a two-star recruit by Rivals.com.

College career
He accepted a scholarship to the University of Wisconsin where he was a member of the Wisconsin Badgers football team from 2009-2013. He set a school record by playing in 54 games, never missing a game over his four-year career. He started 30 games for the Badgers, recording 152 total tackles and 11.5 tackles for loss, forcing four fumbles, adding two interceptions and breaking up 11 passes.

Professional career

Atlanta Falcons
Southward was drafted by the Atlanta Falcons in the third round (68th overall) of the 2014 NFL Draft. In Week 11 of the 2014 season, Southward picked off Cleveland Browns quarterback Brian Hoyer for his first career interception.

During the 2015 offseason, the Atlanta Falcons hired Dan Quinn as their head coach, replacing the outgoing Mike Smith. Quinn quickly changed Southward to a cornerback, from his natural safety position, and praised Southward's "speed and length".

Southward was waived by the Falcons on November 6, 2015, after appearing in just three games for the Falcons.

Indianapolis Colts
Southward was signed to the Indianapolis Colts' practice squad on November 10, 2015. On August 30, 2016, Southward was placed on injured reserve. On September 7, 2016, he was released from their injured reserve with an injury settlement.

Carolina Panthers
On December 28, 2016, Southward was signed to the Carolina Panthers' practice squad. He signed a reserve/future contract with the Panthers on January 12, 2017.

On September 2, 2017, Southward was waived by the Panthers and was signed to the practice squad the next day. He was promoted to the active roster on October 6, 2017. He was waived on October 16, 2017 and was re-signed to the practice squad the next day. He signed a reserve/future contract with the Panthers on January 8, 2018.

On September 1, 2018, Southward was waived by the Panthers and was signed to the practice squad the next day. He was released on September 11, 2018, but was re-signed on September 24. He was released again on October 30, 2018.

References

External links
Wisconsin Badgers bio 

1990 births
Living people
American football safeties
Atlanta Falcons players
Carolina Panthers players
Indianapolis Colts players
People from Sunrise, Florida
Players of American football from Fort Lauderdale, Florida
Sportspeople from Broward County, Florida
Southward, Dezmen
Wisconsin Badgers football players